BAHA may refer to:

Bone anchored hearing aid
Cochlear Baha
Berkeley Architectural Heritage Association
Havelsan BAHA, a Turkish UAV
Relating to the Baháʼí Faith
A misspelling of Baja

See also
Baha (disambiguation)

Cochlear Baha